Toxopidae is a small family of araneomorph spiders, first described in 1940. For many years it was sunk into Desidae as a subfamily, although doubts were expressed as to whether this was correct. A large-scale molecular phylogenetic study in 2016 led to the family being revived.

Genera

, the World Spider Catalog accepts the following genera:

Gasparia Marples, 1956 – New Zealand
Gohia Dalmas, 1917 – New Zealand
Hapona Forster, 1970 – New Zealand
Hulua Forster & Wilton, 1973 – New Zealand
Jamara Davies, 1995 – Australia
Laestrygones Urquhart, 1894 – New Zealand, Australia
Lamina Forster, 1970 – New Zealand
Midgee Davies, 1995 – Australia
Myro O. Pickard-Cambridge, 1876 – Australia, New Zealand
Neomyro Forster & Wilton, 1973 – New Zealand
Ommatauxesis Simon, 1903 – Australia
Otagoa Forster, 1970 – New Zealand
Toxops Hickman, 1940 – Australia
Toxopsoides Forster & Wilton, 1973 – Australia, New Zealand

References

 
Araneomorphae families